Abu Kanneh (born 9 November 1983) is a Liberian footballer who plays as a striker for DSV Leoben. He previously played for FC Gratkorn. He is also a member of the Liberia national football team.

References

1983 births
Living people
Liberian footballers
Association football forwards
FC Gratkorn players